Eleanor Coster (born 1996) is a Welsh female track cyclist.

Cycling career
Coster became a British champion after winning the time trial Championship at the 2019 British National Track Championships

She also represented Wales at the 2018 Commonwealth Games.

References

1996 births
Living people
British female cyclists
British track cyclists
Welsh track cyclists
Cyclists at the 2018 Commonwealth Games
Commonwealth Games competitors for Wales
Cyclists at the 2022 Commonwealth Games